James Allison McDonough (born June 6, 1950) is a Canadian former professional ice hockey player who played 237 games in the National Hockey League and 200 games in the World Hockey Association.

McDonough was born in Hamilton, Ontario.

Career statistics

External links 

1950 births
Atlanta Flames players
Canadian ice hockey right wingers
Cleveland Crusaders players
Detroit Red Wings players
Ice hockey people from Ontario
Kansas City Red Wings players
Living people
Los Angeles Kings draft picks
Los Angeles Kings players
Minnesota Fighting Saints players
Pittsburgh Penguins players
Sportspeople from Hamilton, Ontario